Speciosa Naigaga Wandira Kazibwe (born 1 July 1954), is a Ugandan politician and first female vice president in Africa. She was the sixth vice president of Uganda from 1994 to 2003, making her the first woman in Africa to hold the position of vice-president of a sovereign nation. Dr. Speciosa Kazibwe is also a Ugandan surgeon. She is also referred to as "Nnalongo", because of her twins. In August 2013, she was appointed by the United Nations's Secretary General, Ban Ki-Moon as United Nations Special Envoy for HIV/AIDS in Africa.

Background and education
Speciosa Kazibwe was born in Iganga District on 1 July 1954. She attended Mount Saint Mary's College Namagunga, a prestigious all-female boarding high school affiliated with the Catholic Church, located on the Kampala-Jinja Highway, near the town of Lugazi. In 1974 she entered Makerere University School of Medicine, where she studied human medicine, graduating with the Bachelor of Medicine and Bachelor of Surgery degree in 1979. She later obtained the degree of Master of Medicine, also from Makerere University Medical School, specializing in General Surgery. In 2009, she was awarded the degree of Doctor of Science (SD), by Harvard School of Public Health, Department of Population and International Health.

Work experience
Kazibwe began her political career as a Chairperson of Chairpersons of Halls of Residence at Makerere University Kampala (1975–76) - the equivalent of a University Guild President, which had been abolished by then President Idi Amin Dada. She later became a member of the youth and women's wings of the Ugandan Democratic Party. She won her first election as a village leader, on the ticket of the National Resistance Movement (NRM) in 1987.  She was later elected Women's Representative for Kampala District and became Chairperson of the Advisory Committee for Museveni's election campaign.

She first began serving the administration of Yoweri Museveni in 1989, when she was appointed Deputy Minister for Industry, a post she held until 1991. From 1991 until 1994, she served as Minister for Gender and Community Development. She was a member of the Constitution Assembly which drafted Uganda's new constitution in 1994. In 1996, she was elected Member of Parliament for the constituency of Kigulu South in Iganga District. From 1994 until 2003, Speciosa Kazibwe served as Uganda's Vice President and as Minister of Agriculture, Animal Industry and Fisheries.

Kazibwe has been an advocate for women in their position in Africa.  In collaboration with the Organization of African Unity and the United Nations Economic Commission for Africa, she founded the African Women Committee on Peace and Development (AWCPD) in 1998; an organization she has chaired. The objective of AWCPD is to help enable women's participation in peace and development processes on the continent. Dr. Kazibwe has also been chair or a member of various national interest groups, including:

 The Senior Women's Advisory Group on the Environment
 The Uganda Women Entrepreneurs Association Limited
 The Uganda Women Doctors Association
 Agri-Energy Roundtable Uganda (AER/U)

Kazibwe chaired the inaugural conference of the AER/Uganda on November 25, 1991 at the Kampala Sheraton and also served on the Committee of Honor of the Agri-Energy Roundtable (AER) for several years, gaining wide recognition. In 1998, the Food and Agriculture Organization (FAO) awarded her the "Ceres Medal" for her "contribution to food security and poverty eradication".

Personal details
In April 2002, Kazibwe filed for divorce from her husband, saying that she refused to be the victim of continued domestic violence. Polygamy and wife beating are relatively common in Uganda, but divorce is relatively rare. Her husband opposed the divorce, citing his Catholic faith, and saying that his wife had come home late without giving a proper explanation, and had joined with some other politicians he did not like. Finding it difficult to perform her political duties and deal with the increasingly messy divorce case, on Wednesday, 21 May 2003, Kazibwe stepped down from her positions in government, asking to be allowed to continue her studies.  She completed a doctorate at Harvard University. She has four children including twins from her first marriage and has adopted several others.

References

External links
 About Domestic Abuse in Uganda

Vice presidents of Uganda
1954 births
Living people
Democratic Party (Uganda) politicians
Makerere University alumni
National Resistance Movement politicians
People from Iganga District
People from Eastern Region, Uganda
Ugandan public health doctors
Agriculture ministers of Uganda
Industry ministers of Uganda
Fisheries ministers of Uganda
20th-century Ugandan women politicians
20th-century Ugandan politicians
21st-century Ugandan women politicians
21st-century Ugandan politicians
Harvard School of Public Health alumni
Women government ministers of Uganda
People educated at Mount Saint Mary's College Namagunga
Fellows of the College of Surgeons of East, Central and Southern Africa
Women vice presidents
Ugandan surgeons
Ugandan women surgeons
21st-century Ugandan women scientists
21st-century Ugandan scientists
Special Envoys of the Secretary-General of the United Nations
Women public health doctors